Dascyllus marginatus (marginate dascyllus or Red Sea dascyllus) is a damselfish from the Western Indian Ocean. It occasionally makes its way into the aquarium trade. It grows to a size of 6 cm in length.

References

External links
 

marginatus
Fish described in 1829